Morgan Higby Night (born August 15, 1970) is an American writer, director, producer, and DJ. His works include; feature film Matters of Consequence, an award-winning video for The Asylum Street Spankers, The Shim Sham Club,  Devil's Night Radio and Hicksville Trailer Palace. He is the father of Lydia Night of The Regrettes.

Early life
Night was born in Canoga Park, California on August 15, 1970. His maternal Grandfather was a philanthropist, and founder of City National Bank, Alfred Hart.

DJ career
Night's DJ career started in 1989 in Chico, CA at the Shell Cove and has continued at The Roxbury, Burgundy Room, Bigfoot Lodge, Shim Sham Club and Bar 107 in Downtown Los Angeles. In 1998 Night had a radio show on the Los Angeles "pirate radio" station KBLT, called "2 Martini Breakfast; The Show for the Aspiring Alcoholic". The show and station are featured in the book 40 Watts from Nowhere, by Sue Carpenter.

Film Production and Directing
At age 27, Night directed, produced, wrote and starred in his first feature film, Matters Of Consequence. It was the first film to feature The Pussycat Dolls and won the "MovieMaker Magazine Breakthrough Award" at the New Orleans Film Festival.
Associate Producer of his friend John Cameron Mitchell's film Shortbus. Co-producer of the 1994 feature "Talking About Sex" starring Kim Wayans and featuring a then unknown Mark Cuban.

Shim Sham Club
Night moved to New Orleans, and opened The Shim Sham Club in 1999. He produced the burlesque show The Shim Shamettes, a burlesque revival troupe. Several bands came through there including The Cramps, The White Stripes, The Hives, The Donnas, Jim Carroll, Lydia Lunch, Rudy Ray Moore, The Melvins, The Breeders and Sam Butera. Los Angeles' X played the closing night of the Shim Sham and Night moved back to Los Angeles in 2003.

Music video
Wrote and Directed several music videos, including videos for Joan Jett and the Blackhearts, Kim Lenz, Throw Rag and the Webby Award winning video for The Asylum Street Spankers, "Stick Magnetic Ribbons on your S.U.V." There are several cameos in Night directed videos. John Doe of X and Duane Peters of U.S. Bombs appear in "Androgynous". Selene Luna appears in "She Don't Want To. She Don't Care." Mighty Mike Murga, Greta Valenti, Ainjel Emme and Jesika Von Rabbit appear in "Ragtime Man"

Controversy
In 2009, several websites refused to post Night's music video for Charlie King's  "Ragtime Man" because of its controversial nature. The video is a "Disney like" musical about a man who loves women during their menstruation cycle.

Devil's Night Radio!
Launched a radio station in 2006 called Devil's Night Radio.

Devil's Night Drive In
Drive In movie event launched by Night in Downtown Los Angeles. Started in 2006, Devil's Night Drive In shows cult classic movies twice a month during summer and once a month during winter. Event features FM transmitter, Car Hops, Concessions and Astroturf.

Hicksville Trailer Palace
Opened in 2010,Hicksville Trailer Palace in Joshua Tree, California is described as a "Trailer Park Motel and Artist Retreat." It features vintage themed trailers, a world class recording studio, feature film edit bay, and several activities on the property.

Hicksville Pines Bud & Breakfast
Opened in 2016, in Idyllwild, California as a marijuana friendly hotel or Bud and Breakfast in September 2017. It features ten themed rooms including collaborations with Dita Von Teese and Third Man Records. Other themes include tributes to Dolly Parton, the TV Show Twin Peaks, John Waters and Disney's Haunted Mansion.

Awards
1998 - Winner Movie Maker Breakthrough Award - New Orleans Film Festival - Matters of Consequence
2007 - Official Honoree - Webby Awards - Music/Variety - "Stick Magnetic Ribbons on your S.U.V."
2019 - 100 Best Hotels in the World(Hicksville Pines) - Fodor's Travel

Cover-Me.org
A non-profit organization launched in 2010 by Night. They sell donated cover songs and use the money to buy blankets for downtown Los Angeles homeless.

Filmography
1994 Talking About Sex (Feature Film) Co-Producer
1995 Skooled (Short Film) Producer, Writer, Director / Actor
1998 Matters of Consequence (Feature Film) Producer / Writer / Director / Actor
2005 Throw Rag - "She Don't Want To. She Don't Care" (Music Video) Producer / Writer / Director
2006 Asylum Street Spankers - "Stick Magnetic Ribbons on your S.U.V." (Music Video) Producer / Writer / Director
2006 Shortbus (Feature Film) Associate Producer
2007 Joan Jett & the Blackhearts - "Androgynous" (Music Video) Producer / Writer / Director
2009 Kim Lenz & her Jaguars - "Zombie for Your Love" (Music Video) Producer / Writer / Director
2009 Charlie King - "Ragtime Man" (Music Video) Producer / Writer / Director
2014 Pretty Little Demons - "Unknown Species" (Music Video) Producer / Writer / Director
2016 The Regrettes - "Hey Now" (Music Video) Producer / Writer / Director

References

External links

 

1970 births
Living people
American male screenwriters
American film producers
American film directors